Atomic Energy Education Society (AEES) was set up to provide quality education for the children of the employees of the Department of Atomic Energy of India, and its constituent units in Mumbai, Maharashtra. It was established in 1969 with one school in Anushaktinagar, Mumbai. AEES comes under Government of India Department of Atomic Energy

It administers 31 schools and junior colleges at 14 locations all over the country with more than 26,000 students on its rolls. Managed by 1504  staff members, of which about 1213 are teachers.

References

Central Board of Secondary Education
Government agencies for energy (India)
Educational organisations in Maharashtra
Energy in Maharashtra
Educational institutions established in 1969
1969 establishments in Maharashtra